David Clark Salo is a swimming coach based in Southern California, United States. He was the head coach of the men's and women's swimming team at University of Southern California, as well as USC's club team, Trojan Swim Club. Prior to his becoming the USC coach in 2007, he was the head coach of Irvine Novaquatics, a position he held since the fall of 1990, and was head coach of Soka University of America's men's and women's swimming teams from 2003 to 2006. He currently remains Novaquatics' General Manager.

He was hired as head coach of Novaquatics after a previous appointment with the University of Southern California, where he served as men's assistant coach under head coach Peter Daland. While at USC, Salo assisted with the sprint group while also serving as recruiting coordinator during his final two years at the university. During Salo's tenure the Trojans earned NCAA top five honours, taking second in 1986 and 1987.

While head coach of the Irvine Novaquatics, Salo led his team to a number of age group championships (BC and Junior Olympic) as well as several Junior National Team Championships and the United States Swimming National Championships (Men, Women, Combined, Combined Under 18).

Along with team championships, Salo coached five swimmers – Amanda Beard, Aaron Peirsol, Jason Lezak, Gabrielle Rose, and Staciana Stitts – that represented the United States at the 2000 Olympic Games, winning five medals.

In 2003, Salo was director of aquatics and head coach at Soka University of America.

In 2004, Salo coached Jason Lezak, Colleen Lanne', Gabe Woodward and Lenny Krayzelburg to the USA Olympic Team. He also served as assistant coach for the USA's men's team.

In 2012, Salo coached Jessica Hardy, Rebecca Soni, Ricky Berens, Eric Shanteau, and Haley Anderson to the USA Olympic Team, along with Katinka Hosszú to the Hungarian Team and Oussama Mellouli to the Tunisia Team. He was one of the assistant coaches. His relationship with Hosszú has been controversial; according to her, when she looked for advice during the 2012 Summer Olympics, Salo replied that she should worry because she "can always open a beauty salon"; after the incident, Hosszú left Salo and began training with Shane Tusup.

Salo has also served as assistant coach for the USA Women's team in the 1999 Pan American Games as well as the 2000 Olympic Games and headed the Men's Team at the Goodwill Games in 2001 and the 2005 World Championship Team.

Salo is a graduate of Long Beach State (B.A. and M.A.) and the University of Southern California (Ph.D.)

Trivia
 Australian freestyler Ian Thorpe trained with Salo in Summer 2006.

References

External links
 "20 Questions with Dave Salo" at USA Swimming
 What Dr. Dave Salo Does, by Dave Denniston

Year of birth missing (living people)
Living people
American Olympic coaches
American swimming coaches
College swimming coaches in the United States
California State University, Long Beach alumni
University of Southern California alumni
USC Trojans swimming coaches